The following is a list of lists of well documented famous centenarians by categorized occupation (people who lived to be or are currently living at 100 years or more of age) that are therein known for reasons other than just longevity.

Famous people by career

 List of centenarians (activists, nonprofit leaders and philanthropists)
 List of centenarians (actors, filmmakers and entertainers)
 List of centenarians (artists, painters and sculptors)
 List of centenarians (authors, editors, poets and journalists)
 List of centenarians (businesspeople)
 List of centenarians (educators, school administrators, social scientists and linguists)
 List of centenarians (engineers, mathematicians and scientists)
 List of centenarians (explorers)
 List of centenarians (jurists and practitioners of law)
 List of centenarians (Major League Baseball players)
 List of centenarians (medical professionals)
 List of centenarians (military commanders and soldiers)
 List of centenarians (miscellaneous)
 List of centenarians (musicians, composers and music patrons)
 List of centenarians (National Football League players)
 List of centenarians (philosophers and theologians)
 List of centenarians (politicians and civil servants)
 List of centenarians (religious figures)
 List of centenarians (royalty and nobility)
 List of centenarians (sportspeople)

Other lists
 List of supercentenarians (people who have reached 110 years of age)